Oya Araslı (born in 1943)  is a female Turkish academic and politician. She was born in Bursa to Kemal and Naciye Tezel.  After studying at Faculty of Law in the Istanbul University she he earned a doctorate at the Faculty of Law in Ankara University. She chose academic career and became the professor of constitution. Her husband was Doğan Araslı (died in 1990), a well known politician in Republican People's Party (CHP).

Oya Araslı in politics
After CHP was reestablished, Oya Araslı became a member of the party. Between 8 January 1996 - 18 April 1999 she was elected as an MP  from Mersin Province. Although she was offered a candidateship for the next election  held on 18 April 1999, she declined the offer protesting the party policy towards the female candidates. (Nevertheless, in the elections, her party was unable to receive more than 10% of the votes which is required to qualify to participate in the parliament.) Her second term in parliament began in 2002.  Between  14 November 2002 - 22 July 2007 Oya Araslı was elected as an MP from Ankara Province.

According to the Turkish constitution, each party with over twenty seats form a parliamentary group and each group is represented by 1-3 group vice chairpersons who are authorized to represent, the relevant party in the parliament.  In her first term  Oya Araslı served as a group vice chairperson of her party. Thus she became the very first female group vice chairperson in Turkey. In 2000 during the period in which her party was out of the parliament she briefly served as the secretary general of her party.

References

1943 births
Republican People's Party (Turkey) politicians
Living people
Istanbul University Faculty of Law alumni
Ankara University Faculty of Law alumni
Deputies of Ankara
Deputies of Mersin
Turkish academics
People from Bursa
Members of the 22nd Parliament of Turkey
Members of the 20th Parliament of Turkey
21st-century Turkish women politicians
21st-century Turkish politicians